Shadowboxer is a 2005 crime thriller film directed by Lee Daniels and starring Cuba Gooding Jr., Helen Mirren, and Mo'Nique. It opened in limited release in six cities: New York, Los Angeles, Washington, D.C., Baltimore, Philadelphia, and Richmond, Virginia.

Plot
Mikey and his stepmother Rose are contract killers and lovers. The two continue with their line of work despite the fact that Rose is suffering from cancer.

Organized crime kingpin Clayton suspects that his pregnant wife Vicki may have been unfaithful, so he hires Mikey and Rose to kill her. Upon entering Clayton's mansion, Rose heads for Vicki's bedroom while Vicki is on the phone with her best friend Neisha. But as Rose enters Vicki's bedroom, Vicki's water breaks and she goes into labor.  Taking pity on Vicki, Rose uses her prior medical training to deliver Vicki's baby, a boy she later names Anthony. Afterward, Mikey and Rose drive Vicki and her infant son to a local motel.

At Rose's request, Mikey calls Dr. Don, Clayton's private doctor. Dr. Don arrives with his drug-addicted nurse/lover, Precious. Dr. Don provides medical assistance to Vicki and her baby before leaving. Over Mikey's objections, Rose insists that they take Vicki and her infant son to a safe place. The four end up in Philadelphia.

Meanwhile, Neisha arrives at Clayton's mansion, demanding to know where Vicki is. Clayton becomes nervous that Neisha knows too much and pays Mikey to kill her, which he does by poisoning. Mikey and Rose then move Vicki and her son to a house in upstate Pennsylvania. Mikey carries on with the contract killings alone as Rose has become too ill to accompany him.

At the baby's first birthday party, Rose decides she would rather die than suffer from cancer. She and Mikey have sex in the woods, and she has Mikey shoot her as she reaches orgasm. Before she dies, Rose makes Mikey promise to protect Vicki and her baby. Mikey, Vicki, and Anthony live safely for seven years.

Sometime later, Precious discovers Dr. Don performing oral sex on a patient. Hurt and betrayed, Precious leaves his office while threatening to get her revenge.

Vicki becomes concerned about Anthony when she sees him watching Mikey assemble a gun. She later asks Mikey to leave, saying that he does not have to protect them anymore. Mikey realizes that he has grown attached to Anthony and tells Vicki that he wants to stay.

Clayton finds out from Precious that Vicki and Anthony are alive. Clayton then kills Precious in front of Dr. Don, then shoots him in the leg. Mikey, deciding that he no longer wants to kill, determines that his next contract kill will be his final one. When Mikey checks into a hotel he opens the file on his contract, only to find a picture of himself and Vicki leaving their house. Mikey then calls Vicki. Clayton's bodyguard instead answers the phone, causing Mikey to rush home and right into Clayton's trap.

Clayton tortures Mikey in the basement, in part by snipping off one of his fingers with a pair of hedge clippers. Vicki and Anthony are forced to watch. Clayton then turns around to taunt Vicki. At that moment, Mikey disarms the thug who held him down during the finger snipping. During the ensuing struggle, Mikey manages to overpower Clayton and the remaining thug. Clayton recovers and is about to shoot Mikey when Anthony shoots Clayton in the back. After sending Vicki and Anthony outside, Mikey kills Clayton's two unconscious thugs. Mikey then does the same to Clayton after commenting to him just how proud of Anthony Clayton probably is.

Mikey, Vicki, and Anthony escape. Anthony asks Mikey if he is his son, and Mikey replies that he is. Mikey also cautions Anthony to watch out for people like Clayton and his men; the boy responds, "We'll kill 'em."

Cast
 Cuba Gooding Jr. as Mikey
 Helen Mirren as Rose
 Vanessa Ferlito as Vicki
 Stephen Dorff as Clayton Mayfield
 Macy Gray as Neisha
 Joseph Gordon-Levitt as Dr. Don
 Mo'Nique as Precious
 Angel Oquendo as Lamar
 Shaun Brewington as Little Mikey

Reception
Shadowboxer received negative reviews from critics. On Rotten Tomatoes, it holds an approval rating of 17%, based on 58 reviews, with an average score of 3.92/10. The website's critics consensus reads: "With random characters and a preposterous plot, this bizarre thriller might leave you with your mouth hanging open in disbelief."

References

External links
 
 
 
 

2005 films
2006 films
2000s crime drama films
American crime drama films
Films set in Philadelphia
2000s English-language films
Incest in film
Films directed by Lee Daniels
Films about interracial romance
Films shot in Pennsylvania
Films shot in New Jersey
2006 directorial debut films
2005 drama films
2006 drama films
Films scored by Mario Grigorov
2000s American films